The Voronezh Oblast Duma is the regional parliament of Voronezh Oblast, a federal subject of Russia. A total of 56 deputies are elected for five-year terms.

Elections

2020

References

Voronezh Oblast
Politics of Voronezh Oblast